The designation "national first-grade museum" is the highest classification for museums in China, as determined by the State Administration of Cultural Heritage (SACH).

A first-grade museum generally has a comprehensive collection of artifacts, or has a large number of items in its collection with "very high historical, cultural, scientific, and artistic value". A first-grade museum is also expected to be a social and educational institution, with a professional staff, long-term volunteers, and facilities for educational services. First-grade museums are not required to be owned by the state. State-owned museums are expected to open for more than 300 days a year, while non-state-owned museums are only expected to be open for 240 days. Performance measures for the museums are expected to be regularly published on government websites.

Scoring system
The SACH evaluates China's museums using a scoring system comprising three criteria: "comprehensive management and infrastructure" (200 points), "collection management and scientific research" (300 points), and "exhibition and social services" (500 points), with a total score of 1000. Museums scoring more than 800 points are classified as first grade. Among the rest, those scoring more than 600 points are classified as second grade, and those with 400 to 600 points are classified as third grade.

List of first-grade museums

On 16 May 2008, the SACH issued the first batch of 83 national first-grade museums, including the Palace Museum. However, in November 2013, 4 of the 83 museums failed to score more than 800 points in their reassessment, and were demoted to second-grade museums. They were the Beijing Planetarium, the Memorial of the War to Resist US Aggression and Aid Korea in Dandong, the Chinese Navy Museum in Qingdao, and the Xiamen Overseas Chinese Museum.

On 15 November 2012, the SACH announced the second batch of 17 national first-grade museums, including the National Museum of China.

On 19 January 2017, the Chinese Museums Association announced the third batch of 34 national first-grade museums including the Beijing Planetarium, which had previously been demoted.

As of 2013, there were 3,354 museums in China, including 811 private ones. There are 131 museums classified as national first-grade as of 2017.

References

 
Lists of museums in China